Still is the first EP by American metalcore/hardcore band Vision of Disorder, released in 1995.

Track listing
1995 vinyl release

1996 CD release (US, Europe)

1996 CD release (Spain)

References

1995 EPs
Vision of Disorder albums